Hi Fly may refer to:

 Hi Fly (airline), a Portuguese airline
 "Hi-Fly" (Randy Weston song), a jazz standard
 Hi Fly (Peter King album), 1984
 Hi Fly (Rio Nido album), 1985
 Hi-Fly (Horace Parlan album), 1978
 Hi-Fly (Jaki Byard album), 1962